

Events and publications

Year overall
 Another boom year for the burgeoning American comic book industry, as Ace Comics, Columbia Comics, Farrell Publications, Holyoke Publishing, Novelty Press, and Street & Smith Comics all begin publishing.

January
 January 13: Charles Addams' classic cartoon Downhill Skier is published in The New Yorker, showing a skier magically passing around a tree with each foot on one side.
 Ace Comics (1937 series) #34 – David McKay Publications
 Action Comics (1938 series) #20 – DC Comics
 Adventure Comics (1938 series) #46 – DC Comics
 All-American Comics (1939 series) #10 – DC Comics
 Amazing Mystery Funnies (1938 series) #17 – Centaur Publications
 Daring Mystery Comics (1940 series) #1 – Timely Comics
 Detective Comics (1937 series) #35 – DC Comics
 Double Action Comics (1939 series) #2 – National Periodical Publications, consisting entirely of black and white reprints from early issues of More Fun Comics.
 Feature Comics (1939 series) #28 – Quality Comics
 Flash Comics (1940 series) #1 – National Periodical Publications. In this issue Gardner Fox and Harry Lampert's The Flash makes his debut, as well as Fox and Dennis Neville's Hawkman.
 Marvel Mystery Comics (1939 series) #3 – Timely Comics
 More Fun Comics (1936 series) #51 – National Periodical Publications
 Mystery Men Comics (1939 series) #6 – Fox Feature Syndicate
 Smash Comics (1939 series) #6 – Quality Comics
 Teen-Age Romances (1940 series) #1 – St. John Publications debuts January 14

February
 Ace Comics (1937 series) #35 – David McKay Publications
 Action Comics (1938 series) #21 – DC Comics
 Adventure Comics (1938 series) #47 – DC Comics
 All-American Comics (1939 series) #11 – DC Comics
 Daring Mystery Comics (1940 series) #2 – Timely Comics
 Detective Comics (1937 series) #36 – DC Comics
 Feature Comics (1939 series) #29 – Quality Comics
 Flash Comics (1940 series) #2 – National Periodical Publications
 Marvel Mystery Comics (1939 series) #4 – Timely Comics
 More Fun Comics (1936 series) #52 – National Periodical Publications
 Mystery Men Comics (1939 series) #7 – Fox Feature Syndicate
 Smash Comics (1939 series) #7 – Quality Comics
 Whiz Comics #2, the first appearance of Captain Marvel — Fawcett (This is actually #1 due to Whiz Comics #1 doesn't exist)

March 
 Ace Comics (1937 series) #36 – David McKay Publications
 Action Comics (1938 series) #22 – DC Comics
 Adventure Comics (1938 series) #48 – DC Comics
 All-American Comics (1939 series) #12 – DC Comics
 Amazing Mystery Funnies (1938 series) #18 – Centaur Publications
 Detective Comics (1937 series) #37 – DC Comics
 Feature Comics (1939 series) #30 – Quality Comics
 Flash Comics (1940 series) #3 – National Periodical Publications
 Marvel Mystery Comics (1939 series) #5 – Timely Comics
 Master Comics (1940 series) #1 – Fawcett Publications
 More Fun Comics (1936 series) #53 – National Periodical Publications
 Mystery Men Comics (1939 series) #8 – Fox Feature Syndicate
 Mystic Comics (1940 series) #1 – Timely Comics
 Silver Streak Comics (1939 series) #3 — title acquired by Lev Gleason Publications
 Slam-Bang Comics (1940 series) #1 – Fawcett Comics
 Smash Comics (1939 series) #8 – Quality Comics
 Whiz Comics #3 – Fawcett Comics (This is actually #2 due to #1 not being published)

April
 Ace Comics (1937 series) #37 – David McKay Publications
 Action Comics (1938 series) #23 – DC Comics
 Adventure Comics (1938 series) #49 – DC Comics
 All-American Comics (1939 series) #13 – DC Comics
 Amazing Mystery Funnies (1938 series) #19 – Centaur Publications
 Batman (1940 series) #1 – DC Comics, first appearance of Joker, first appearance of Catwoman
 Blue Beetle (1939 series) #2 – Fox Feature Syndicate
 Daring Mystery Comics (1940 series) #3 – Timely Comics
 Detective Comics (1937 series) #38 – DC Comics, first appearance of Robin.
 Feature Comics (1939 series) #31 – Quality Comics
 Flash Comics (1940 series) #4 – National Periodical Publications
 Marvel Mystery Comics (1939 series) #6 – Timely Comics
 Master Comics (1940 series) #2 – Fawcett Publications
 More Fun Comics (1936 series) #54 – National Periodical Publications
 Mystery Men Comics (1939 series) #9 – Fox Feature Syndicate
 Mystic Comics (1940 series) #2 – Timely Comics
 Slam-Bang Comics (1940 series) #2 – Fawcett Comics
 Smash Comics (1939 series) #9 – Quality Comics
 Superman (1939 series) #4 – DC Comics
 Whiz Comics (1940 series) #3 – Fawcett Comics (Numbering will be correct from here on)

May
 May 8: As the Nazis invade Belgium several comics magazines are disestablished forever, including Le Petit Vingtième and Kindervriend. 
 May 27: Already a popular Sunday comic since 1934, Alex Raymond's Flash Gordon now also receives a daily comic series, also written by Don Moore, but drawn by Austin Briggs. The daily comic will last until 1993.
 Ace Comics (1937 series) #38 – David McKay Publications
 Action Comics (1938 series) #24 – DC Comics
 Adventure Comics (1938 series) #50 – DC Comics
 All-American Comics (1939 series) #14 – DC Comics
 Amazing Mystery Funnies (1938 series) #20 – Centaur Publications
 Crack Comics (1940 series) #1 – Quality Comics (First appearance of Alias the Spider, Madame Fatal, Red Torpedo, and Black Condor)
 Daring Mystery Comics (1940 series) #4 – Timely Comics
 Detective Comics (1937 series) #39 – DC Comics
 Doc Savage Comics (1940 series) #1 – Street & Smith Publications
 Feature Comics (1939 series) #32 – Quality Comics
 Flash Comics (1940 series) #5 – National Periodical Publications
 Marvel Mystery Comics (1939 series) #7 – Timely Comics
 Master Comics (1940 series) #3 – Fawcett Comics
 More Fun Comics (1936 series) #55 – National Periodical Publications. In this issue Gardner Fox and Howard Sherman's Doctor Fate makes his debut.
 Mystery Men Comics (1939 series) #10 – Fox Feature Syndicate
 Nickel Comics (1940 series) #1 – Fawcett Comics (First appearance of Bulletman)
 Nickel Comics (1940 series) #2 – Fawcett Comics
 Slam-Bang Comics (1940 series) #3 – Fawcett Comics
 Smash Comics (1939 series) #10 – Quality Comics
 Whiz Comics (1940 series) #4 – Fawcett Comics

June
 June 2: First publication of Will Eisner's "The Spirit Section", featuring debuts of the series The Spirit, Lady Luck and Mr. Mystic. In The Spirit both The Spirit and Ebony White make their debuts.
 June 6: The first issue of the Bulgarian comics magazine Chuden Sviat ("Wonderland") is published.
 June 9: In The Spirit by Will Eisner Ellen Dolan makes her debut. 
 June 17: Walter B. Gibson's character The Shadow makes his debut as a comics character in a syndicated daily newspaper comic, illustrated by Vernon Greene. The series will run until 13 June 1942.
 Ace Comics (1937 series) #39 – David McKay Publications
 Action Comics (1938 series) #25 – DC Comics
 Adventure Comics (1938 series) #51 – DC Comics
 All-American Comics (1939 series) #15 – DC Comics
 Amazing Mystery Funnies (1938 series) #21 – Centaur Publications
 Crack Comics (1940 series) #2 – Quality Comics
 Daring Mystery Comics (1940 series) #5 – Timely Comics
 Detective Comics (1937 series) #40 – DC Comics
 Feature Comics (1939 series) #33 – Quality Comics
 Flash Comics (1940 series) #6 – National Periodical Publications
 Marvel Mystery Comics (1939 series) #8 – Timely Comics
 More Fun Comics (1936 series) #56 – National Periodical Publications
 Mystery Men Comics (1939 series) #11 – Fox Feature Syndicate
 Mystic Comics (1940 series) #3 – Timely Comics
 Nickel Comics (1940 series) #3 – Fawcett Comics
 Nickel Comics (1940 series) #4 – Fawcett Comics
 Slam-Bang Comics (1940 series) #4 – Fawcett Comics
 Smash Comics (1939 series) #11 – Quality Comics
 Whiz Comics (1940 series) #5 – Fawcett Comics

July
 Ace Comics (1937 series) #40 – David McKay Publications
 Action Comics (1938 series) #26 – DC Comics
 Adventure Comics (1938 series) #52 – DC Comics
 All-American Comics (1939 series) #16 – DC Comics, first appearance of Green Lantern (Alan Scott)
 All-Star Comics (1940 series) #1 – DC Comics
 Amazing Mystery Funnies (1938 series) #22 – Centaur Publications
 Batman (1940 series) #2 – DC Comics
 Blue Beetle (1939 series) #3 – Fox Feature Syndicate
 Crack Comics (1940 series) #3 – Quality Comics
 Detective Comics (1937 series) #41 – DC Comics
 Doc Savage Comics (1940 series) #2 – Street & Smith Publications
 Feature Comics (1939 series) #34 – Quality Comics
 Flash Comics (1940 series) #7 – National Periodical Publications
 Hit Comics (1940 series) #1 – Quality Comics
 Marvel Mystery Comics (1939 series) #9 – Timely Comics
 Master Comics (1940 series) #4 – Fawcett Publications
 More Fun Comics (1936 series) #57 – National Periodical Publications
 Mystery Men Comics (1939 series) #12 – Fox Feature Syndicate
 Nickel Comics (1940 series) #5 – Fawcett Comics
 Nickel Comics (1940 series) #6 – Fawcett Comics
 Slam-Bang Comics (1940 series) #5 – Fawcett Comics
 Smash Comics (1939 series) #12 – Quality Comics
 Superman (1939 series) #5 – DC Comics
 Whiz Comics (1940 series) #6 – Fawcett Comics

August
 August 11: In Bob Karp and Al Taliaferro's Donald Duck comic strip Grandma Duck makes her debut in a framed picture. She will only appear as a character from 27 July 1943 onwards.
 Ace Comics (1937 series) #41 – David McKay Publications
 Action Comics (1938 series) #27 – DC Comics
 Adventure Comics (1938 series) #53 – DC Comics
 All-American Comics (1939 series) #17 – DC Comics
 Amazing Mystery Funnies (1938 series) #23 – Centaur Publications
 Crack Comics (1940 series) #4 – Quality Comics
 Detective Comics (1937 series) #42 – DC Comics
 Feature Comics (1939 series) #35 – Quality Comics
 Flash Comics (1940 series) #8 – National Periodical Publications
 Hit Comics (1940 series) #2 – Quality Comics
 Marvel Mystery Comics (1939 series) #10 – Timely Comics
 Master Comics (1940 series) #5 – Fawcett Publications
 More Fun Comics (1936 series) #58 – National Periodical Publications
 Mystery Men Comics (1939 series) #13 – Fox Feature Syndicate
 Mystic Comics (1940 series) #4 – Timely Comics
 Nickel Comics (1940 series) #7 – Fawcett Comics
 Nickel Comics (1940 series) #8 – Fawcett Comics
Red Raven Comics (1940 series) #1 – Timely Comics
 Slam-Bang Comics (1940 series) #6 – Fawcett Comics
 Smash Comics (1939 series) #13 – Quality Comics
 Whiz Comics (1940 series) #7 – Fawcett Comics

September
 September 21: The final episode of C. M. Payne's S'Matter, Pop? is published, which had run since 1910.
 September 22: Maurice Cuvillier's Perlin et Pinpin makes its debut.
 Ace Comics (1937 series) #42 – David McKay Publications
 Action Comics (1938 series) #28 – DC Comics
 Adventure Comics (1938 series) #54 – DC Comics
 All-American Comics (1939 series) #18 – DC Comics
 All-Star Comics (1940 series) #2 – DC Comics
 Amazing Mystery Funnies (1938 series) #24, last issue – Centaur Publications
 Batman (1940 series) #3 – DC Comics
Big 3 (1940 series) #1 – Fox Feature Syndicate
 Blue Beetle (1939 series) #4 – Fox Feature Syndicate
 Crack Comics (1940 series) #5 – Quality Comics
 Daring Mystery Comics (1940 series) #6 – Timely Comics
 Detective Comics (1937 series) #43 – DC Comics
 Feature Comics (1939 series) #36 – Quality Comics
 Flash Comics (1940 series) #9 – National Periodical Publications
 Hit Comics (1940 series) #3 - Quality Comics
 Marvel Mystery Comics (1939 series) #11 – Timely Comics
 Master Comics (1940 series) #6 – Fawcett Publications
 More Fun Comics (1936 series) #59 – National Periodical Publications
 Mystery Men Comics (1939 series) #14 – Fox Feature Syndicate
 Slam-Bang Comics (1940 series) #7 – Fawcett Comics
 Smash Comics (1939 series) #14 – Quality Comics
 Whiz Comics (1940 series) #8 – Fawcett Comics

October
 October 17: The first issue of the short-lived Walloon children's comics magazine Le Soir-Jeunesse, a supplement of the Nazi-controlled Le Soir, is published. It will run until 23 September 1941. In its first issue Hergé's Tintin story The Crab with the Golden Claws is prepublished. Halfway the story Allan Thompson and Captain Haddock make their debut. (In later republications of older Tintin albums Thompson would be retroactively introduced in the older story Cigars of the Pharaoh (1933).)
 October 26: The Italian Disney comics magazine Paperino e altre avventure merges with another Italian Disney magazine, Topolino.
 The first issue of the Belgian comic magazine Aventures Illustrées (later renamed Bimbo) is published. It will run until 1942, when the Nazis ban it. 
 Ace Comics (1937 series) #43 – David McKay Publications
 Action Comics (1938 series) #29 – DC Comics
 Adventure Comics (1938 series) #55 – DC Comics
 All-American Comics (1939 series) #19 – DC Comics
 Crack Comics (1940 series) #6 – Quality Comics
 Detective Comics (1937 series) #44 – DC Comics
 Feature Comics (1939 series) #37 – Quality Comics
 Flash Comics (1940 series) #10 – National Periodical Publications
 Hit Comics (1940 series) #4 – Quality Comics
Human Torch Comics (1940 series) #2 – Timely Comics (Human Torch Comics took over for Red Raven Comics)
 Marvel Mystery Comics (1939 series) #12 – Timely Comics
 Master Comics (1940 series) #7 – Fawcett Publications
 More Fun Comics (1936 series) #60 – National Periodical Publications
 Mystery Men Comics (1939 series) #15 – Fox Feature Syndicate
 Smash Comics (1939 series) #15 – Quality Comics
 Superman (1939 series) #6 – DC Comics
 Whiz Comics (1940 series) #9 – Fawcett Comics

November
 November 4: In Bob Karp and Al Taliaferro's Donald Duck newspaper comic Daisy Duck makes her debut as a comics character, having made her screen debut in the animated short Don Donald six months earlier.
 Ace Comics (1937 series) #44 – David McKay Publications
 Action Comics (1938 series) #30 – DC Comics
 Adventure Comics (1938 series) #56 – DC Comics
 All-American Comics (1939 series) #20 – DC Comics
 All-Star Comics (1940 series) #3 – DC Comics. In this issue Gardner Fox and Sheldon Mayer introduce Justice Society.
 Batman (1940 series) #4 – DC Comics
 Blue Beetle (1939 series) #5 – Fox Feature Syndicate
 Crack Comics (1940 series) #7 – Quality Comics
 Detective Comics (1937 series) #45 – DC Comics
 Feature Comics (1939 series) #38 – Quality Comics
 Flash Comics (1940 series) #11 – National Periodical Publications
 Hit Comics (1940 series) #5 – Quality Comics
 Marvel Mystery Comics (1939 series) #13 – Timely Comics
 Master Comics (1940 series) #8 – Fawcett Publications
 More Fun Comics (1936 series) #61 – National Periodical Publications
 Mystery Men Comics (1939 series) #16 – Fox Feature Syndicate
 Smash Comics (1939 series) #16 – Quality Comics
 Whiz Comics (1940 series) #10 – Fawcett Comics
 Wow Comics (1940 series) #1 – Fawcett Comics (First appearance of Mister Scarlet)

December
 December 19: The Flemish comics magazine Bravo! launches a French-language sister magazine. It will run until 17 April 1951. 
 December 20: Captain America and Bucky Barnes debut in Captain America Comics #1, cover-dated Spring 1941.
 Ace Comics (1937 series) #45 – David McKay Publications
 Action Comics (1938 series) #31 – DC Comics
 Adventure Comics (1938 series) #57 – DC Comics
 All-American Comics (1939 series) #21 – DC Comics
Big 3 (1940 series) #2 – Fox Feature Syndicate
 Crack Comics (1940 series) #8 – Quality Comics
 Detective Comics (1937 series) #46 – DC Comics
 Feature Comics (1939 series) #39 – Quality Comics
 Flash Comics (1940 series) #12 – National Periodical Publications
 Hit Comics (1940 series) #6 – Quality Comics
 Marvel Mystery Comics (1939 series) #14 – Timely Comics
 Master Comics (1940 series) #9 – Fawcett Publications°
 More Fun Comics (1936 series) #62 – National Periodical Publications
 Mystery Men Comics (1939 series) #17 – Fox Feature Syndicate
 Smash Comics (1939 series) #17 – Quality Comics
Spy Smasher (1940 series) #1 – Fawcett Publications
 Superman (1939 series) #7 – DC Comics
 Whiz Comics (1940 series) #11 – Fawcett Comics

Specials
 Mutt & Jeff (1939 series) #2 – All-American Comics
 New York World's Fair Comics (1939 series) #2 – National Periodical Publications
 Special Edition Comics #1- Fawcett Publications

Births

January
 January 26: Gonzalo Mayo, Peruvian comics artist (worked for Eerie and Vampirella), (d. 2021).

April
April 17: Claire Bretécher, French cartoonist.

October
 October 20: Nikita Mandryka, French comics artist (Le Concombre Masqué, Les Clopinettes) and publisher (co-founder of L'Écho des Savanes), (d. 2021).

Specific date unknown
 Antonio Correa Expósito, Spanish comics artist, (d. 2003).

Deaths

January
 January 15: Henri Verstijnen, Dutch comics artist and philosopher (Spitsmuis en Tapir), dies at age 57.

February
 February 27: Johan Braakensiek, Dutch illustrator, painter, graphic artist, political cartoonist and comics artist (Dik Trom), dies at age 81.

May
 May 25: William Conselman, American screenwriter and comics writer (Ella Cinders, Good Time Guy), dies at age 43.

June
 June 3: Charles R. Snelgrove, Canadian comics artist (Robin Hood and Company), dies at age 47.
 June 21: Tjerk Bottema, Dutch caricaturist, political cartoonist, illustrator and comics artist (made some political comics), dies at age 58.

July
 July 20: Harry E. Homan, American comics artist (Billy Make Believe, How to Make It, assisted on Joe Jinks), passes away at age 51 from a heart attack.
 July 28: Gerda Wegener, Danish graphic designer, painter, illustrator and comics artist (erotic comics), dies at age 47 or 51.

September
 September 28: Earl Hurd, American animator and comics artist (Trials of Elder Mouse, Brick Bodkin's Pa, Susie Sunshine, Bobby Bumps), dies at age 60.

October
 October 4: Tom Wood, American illustrator and comics artist (Disney comics), dies at age 53 from injuries in a car accident.
 October 15: Georges Léonnec, French comics artist and illustrator, dies at age 59.

November
 November 9: Nikola Navojev, Yugoslavian comics artist (Tarcaneta, Vukadin, Zigomar, illegal versions of Mickey Mouse), dies at age 27 from TBC.
 November 16: Albert Engström, Swedish novelist and comics artist (Kolingen, Bobban), passes away at age 71.

December
 December 5: 
 Juan Arthenack, Mexican comic artist (Don Prudencio, Adelaido el Conquistador), dies at age 48 or 49.
 Jos Wins, Dutch painter and comic artist (Joco en Coco), dies at age 59.

Specific date unknown
 Lucien Haye, French illustrator and comics artist (L'Homme Aux Cent Visages, Le Prince Kama), died at age 73 or 74.
 Karl Pommerhanz, German-Austrian illustrator and comics artist (made comics for Fliegende Blätter and the Chicago Tribune), dies at age 82 or 83.
 Émile Tap, French illustrator, caricaturist and comic artist (Sam et Sap), dies at age 62 or 63.

First issues by title
All Star Comics, cover-dated Summer, published by All-American Publications
Batman, cover-dated Spring, published by DC Comics.
Big 3, cover-dated September, published by Fox Feature Syndicate
Big Shot Comics, cover-dated May, published by Columbia Comics
Crack Comics, cover-dated May, published by Quality Comics
Daring Mystery Comics, cover-dated January, published by Timely Comics
Doc Savage Comics published by Street & Smith Publications
Flash Comics cover dated January, published by National Periodical Publications
Green Hornet, cover-dated December, published by Helnit
Jackpot Comics, cover-dated Spring, published by MLJ Magazines, Inc.
Master Comics, cover-dated March, published by Fawcett Publications
Red Raven Comics, cover-dated August, published by Timely Comics
Shield-Wizard Comics, cover-dated Summer, published by MLJ Magazines, Inc.
Spy Smasher, cover-dated December, published by Fawcett Publications
Walt Disney's Comics and Stories, cover-dated October, published by Dell Comics
Wow Comics, cover-dated Winter, published by Fawcett Comics
Zip Comics, cover-dated June, published by MLJ Magazines, Inc.

Initial appearances by character name
Atom (Al Pratt) in All-American Comics #19 (October), created by Ben Flinton and Bill O'Connor, published by National Periodical Publications
Black Condor in Crack Comics #1 (May), created by Will Eisner and Lou Fine, published by Quality Comics
Black Pirate (Jon Valor) in Action Comics #23 (April), created by Sheldon Moldoff, Published by DC Comics
Breeze Barton in Daring Mystery Comics #3 (April), created by Jack Binder and E. C. Stoner, published by Timely Comics
Bulletman in Nickel Comics #1 (May), created by Bill Parker and Jon Smalle, published by Fawcett Comics
Bulletgirl in Nickel Comics #1 (May), created by Bill Parker and Jon Smalle, published by Fawcett Comics
Captain Marvel (DC Comics) in Whiz Comics #2 (February), created by C. C. Beck and Bill Parker, published by Fawcett Comics
Captain Bob Strong in Daring Mystery Comics #3 (April), created by Jack Alderman, published by Timely Comics
Catwoman in Batman #1 (Spring), created by Bill Finger and Bob Kane, published by DC Comics
Clayface (Basil Karlo) in Detective Comics #40 (June), created by Bill Finger and Bob Kane. published by DC Comics
Congo Bill in More Fun Comics #56, created by Whitney Ellsworth and George Papp. published by DC Comics
Cyclotron (comics) in Action Comics #21 (February), created by Jerry Siegel and Joe Shuster, published by DC Comics
Dennis Burton in Daring Mystery Comics #2 (February), created by Will Harr, published by Timely Comics
Doctor Fate (Kent Nelson) in More Fun Comics #55 (May), created by Gardner Fox and artist Howard Sherman, published by National Periodical Publications
Doctor Hormone in Popular Comics #54 (August), published by Dell Comics
Doctor Sivana in Whiz Comics #2 (February), created by Bill Parker and C. C. Beck, published by Fawcett Comics
Dynaman in Daring Mystery Comics #6 (September), created by Steve Dahlman, published by Timely Comics
Falcon (Carl Burgess) in Daring Mystery Comics #5 (June), created by Maurice Gutwirth, published by Timely Comics
Fiery Mask in Daring Mystery Comics #1 (January), created by Joe Simon, published by Timely Comics
Flash (Jay Garrick) in Flash Comics #1 (January), created by Gardner Fox and Harry Lampert, published by National Periodical Publications
Flash Foster in Daring Mystery Comics #1 (January), created by Bob Wood, published by Timely Comics
Green Lantern (Alan Scott) in All-American Comics #16 (July), created by Martin Nodell, published by National Periodical Publications
Hawkgirl (Shiera Sanders) in Flash Comics #1 (January), Created by Gardner Fox and Denis Neville, published by National Periodical Publications
Hawkman (Carter Hall) in Flash Comics #1 (January), created by Gardner Fox and Dennis Neville, published by National Periodical Publications
Hourman (Rex Tyler) in Adventure Comics #48 (March), created by Ken Fitch and Bernard Baily, published by DC Comics
Hugo Strange in Detective Comics #36 (February), created by Bill Finger and Bob Kane, published by DC Comics
Ibis the Invincible in Whiz Comics #2 (February), created by Bob Kingett, published by Fawcett Comics
Inza Nelson in More Fun Comics #55 (May), created by Gardner Fox, published by DC Comics
Jim Corrigan in More Fun Comics #52 (February), created by Jerry Siegel and Bernard Baily, published by National Periodical Publications
John Steele in Daring Mystery Comics #1 (January), created Dean Carr, published by Timely Comics
Johnny Thunder in Flash Comics #1 (January), created by John Wentworth and Stan Aschmeier, published by DC Comics
Joker (comics) in Batman #1 (Spring), created by Jerry Robinson (concept), Bill Finger, and Bob Kane, published by DC Comics
Justice Society of America in All Star Comics #3 (Winter), created by Sheldon Mayer and Gardner Fox, published by DC Comics
King Standish in Flash Comics #3 (March), created by Gardner Fox, published by DC Comics
Kulak (DC Comics) in All Star Comics #2 (September), created by Gardner Fox, published by DC Comics
Lex Luthor in Action Comics #23 (April), created by Jerry Siegel and Joe Shuster, published by DC Comics
Magno (Quality Comics) in Smash Comics #13 (August), created by Paul Gustavson, published by Quality Comics
Marvex the Super-Robot in Daring Mystery Comics #3 (March), created by Hal Sharp, published by Timely Comics
Max Mercury in National Comics #5 (November), created by Jack Cole and Chuck Mazoujian, published by Quality Comics
Mister E in Daring Mystery Comics #2 (February), created by Joe Cal Cagno, published by Timely Comics
Monako in Daring Mystery Comics #1 (January), created Larry Antonette, published by Timely Comics
Neon the Unknown in Hit Comics #1 (July), created by Jerry Iger, published by Quality Comics
Phantom Bullet in Daring Mystery Comics #2 (February), created by Joe Simon, published by Timely Comics
Phantom Reporter in Daring Mystery Comics #3 (April), created by Robert O. Erisman, published by Timely Comics
Perry White in Superman #7 (November), created by Jerry Siegel and Joe Shuster, published by DC Comics
Ray (comics) in Smash Comics #14 (September), created by Lou Fine, published by Quality Comics
Red Bee (comics) in Hit Comics #1 (July), created by Tony Blum and Charles Nicholas, published by Quality Comics
Red Tornado (Ma Hunkel) in All-American Comics #20 (November), created by Sheldon Mayer, published by DC Comics
Red Torpedo in Crack Comics #1 (May), created by Will Eisner, published by Quality Comics
Robin (Dick Grayson) in Detective Comics #40 (June), created by Jerry Robinson (concept), Bill Finger, and Bob Kane, published by DC Comics
Shazam (wizard) in Whiz Comics #2 (February), created by C. C. Beck and Bill Parker, published by Fawcett Comics
Silver Streak in Silver Streak Comics #3 (March), created by Joe Simon, published by Lev Gleason Publications
Spider (DC Comics) in Crack Comics #1 (May), created by Paul Gustavson, published by Quality Comics
Spirit (comics) in Register and Tribune Syndicate (June), created by Will Eisner, published by Eisner & Iger
Spy Smasher in Whiz Comics #2 (February), created by C.C. Beck and Bill Parker, published by Fawcett Comics
The Spectre in More Fun Comics #52 (February), created by Jerry Siegel and Bernard Baily, published by National Periodical Publications
Uncle Sam (comics) in National Comics #1 (July), created by Will Eisner, published by Quality Comics
Wotan (comics) in More Fun Comics #55 (May), created by Gardner Fox and Howard Sherman, published by DC Comics
Zachary Zor in More Fun Comics #55 (May), created by Jerry Siegel, published by DC Comics

References